is a Japanese film director. His film Shizumanu Taiyō won the Japan Academy Prize for Picture of the Year at the 33rd Japan Academy Prize.

Filmography
Whiteout (2000)
Shizumanu Taiyō (2009)
Yoake no Machi de (2011)
Zakurozaka no Adauchi (2014)
Fukushima 50 (2020)

References

External links
 

Living people
People from Akita (city)
Japanese film directors
1949 births